, provisional designations  and , as well as periodic cometary number , is a kilometer-sized asteroid from the outer regions of the asteroid belt and the first "binary main-belt comet" ever discovered.

 belongs to the exclusive class of main-belt comets, which display properties of both comets and asteroids. The object was discovered by Spacewatch in 2006. Its binary nature was confirmed by the Hubble Space Telescope in September 2016. Both primary and its minor-planet moon are similar in mass and size, making it a true binary system. The components are estimated to measure 1.8 kilometers in diameter, orbiting each other at a wide separation of 104 kilometers every 135 days.

Discovery 

 was discovered on 15 November 2006, by the Spacewatch survey at Kitt Peak National Observatory near Tucson, Arizona. The possible cometary activity was seen in November 2011 by Pan-STARRS. Both Spacewatch and Pan-STARRS are asteroid survey projects of NASA's Near Earth Object Observations Program.

Orbit and classification 

 is a non-family asteroid of the main-belt's background population. It is both a binary asteroid and a main-belt comet, also known as "active asteroid". It orbits the Sun in the outer main-belt at a distance of 2.4–3.7 AU once every 5 years and 4 months (1,944 days; semi-major axis of 3.05 AU). Its orbit has an eccentricity of 0.20 and an inclination of 3° with respect to the ecliptic.

The body's observation arc begins on September 2000, with a precovery taken by the Sloan Digital Sky Survey at Apache Point Observatory, New Mexico, more than six years prior to its official discovery observation by Spacewatch at Kitt Peak.

First binary main-belt comet 

 was first observed by the Hubble Space Telescope (HST) in December 2011. It was imaged by HST in September 2016, just before it made its closest approach to the Sun and confirmed its binary nature with two asteroids orbiting each other, and revealed ongoing cometary activity. This makes the object the first known binary asteroid that is also classified as a main-belt comet. The binary is thought to be the result of fission of the precursor caused by YORP-driven spinup.

Observations of the HST revealed ongoing activity in this binary system. The combined features of this binary asteroid - wide separation, near-equal component size, high eccentricity orbit, and comet-like activity also make it unique among the few known binary asteroids that have a wide separation.

Physical characteristics

Diameter albedo and mass 

 has a derived diameter of  kilometer. The Collaborative Asteroid Lightcurve Link assumes an albedo of 0.057 and calculates a diameter of 3.20 kilometers based on an absolute magnitude of 16.2.

Numbering and naming 

This minor planet was numbered by the Minor Planet Center on 12 October 2011. As of 2020, it has not been named.

Notes

References

External links 
 Comet or Asteroid? Hubble Discovers that a Unique Object is a Binary, Hubblesite, September 2017
 Asteroids with Satellites, Robert Johnston, johnstonsarchive.net
 Asteroid Lightcurve Database (LCDB), query form (info )
 Dictionary of Minor Planet Names, Google books
 Asteroids and comets rotation curves, CdR – Observatoire de Genève, Raoul Behrend
 Discovery Circumstances: Numbered Minor Planets (300001)-(305000) – Minor Planet Center
 
 

300163
0288
300163
300163
20061115